UPCS may refer to:

 Unlicensed Personal Communications Services
 University Park Campus School
 University Counseling and Psychological Services, see University Counseling Centers
 University of the Philippines Cherubim and Seraphim

See also 
 UCP (disambiguation)